The St. Thomas Curling Classic (previously Roy Inch & Sons Service Experts Classic and the Arctic Snowplows Classic before 2014) is a bonspiel, part of the men's Ontario Curling Tour. The event is held in October and takes place at the St. Thomas Curling Club in St. Thomas, Ontario.

In the past, the event has been open to both men's and women's teams. In 2013, Sherry Middaugh's team made it all the way to the final. That year, 4 of the 16 teams entered were women's rinks.

Past Champions

References

Ontario Curling Tour events
St. Thomas, Ontario